Outdoor Photographer is an American nature photography magazine.  It is published eleven times per year, monthly, save for a combined January/February issue.

History and profile
Outdoor Photographer was founded by Steve Werner and first published in 1985. In 2000, it had roughly 172,000 regular subscribers.  Regular contributors have included Galen Rowell, Frans Lanting, Dewitt Jones, William Neill, Amy Gulick, and Justin Black.

In July 2014, columnist Bob Krist revealed that he was not paid by the magazine in over a year. Many other contributors were awaiting payment, as well, and the magazine stopped responding to payment requests. In July 2015, an announcement was made that the magazine was acquired by the Boston-based publishing company Madavor Media. Shortly after the announcement, former contributors were contacted and promised that information would soon be provided about how to recover fees owed by the former owner. The headquarters of the magazine is in Braintree, Massachusetts.

References

External links
 
 Mavador Media acquisition press release

1985 establishments in the United States
Consumer magazines
Magazines established in 1985
Magazines published in California
Monthly magazines published in the United States
Photography magazines
Visual arts magazines published in the United States
Magazines published in Massachusetts
Economy of Braintree, Massachusetts
Mass media in Norfolk County, Massachusetts